Monika Zingg (born 11 March 1943) is a Swiss figure skater. She competed in the ladies' singles event at the 1964 Winter Olympics.

References

1943 births
Living people
Swiss female single skaters
Olympic figure skaters of Switzerland
Figure skaters at the 1964 Winter Olympics